Panshin is a surname. Notable people with the surname include:

Aleksandr Panshin (1863–1904), Russian speed skater and figure skater
Alexei Panshin (born 1940), American writer and science fiction critic
Cory Panshin (born 1947), American writer and science fiction critic
Mikhail Panshin (born 1983), Kazakhstani-Russian ice hockey player